Kindred Spirits is the fourth studio album by the Northern Irish Celtic metal band Waylander. It was released in 2012 on Listenable Records.

Track listing

Personnel
 Ard Chieftain O'Hagan - vocals
 Tor Dennison - guitars
 Michael Procter - bass, backing vocals
 Den Ferran - drums
 Saul McMichael - guitars
 Dave Briggs - whistles, Irish bouzouki, mandolin, bodhrán, backing vocals

Additional personnel
 Mika Jussila - mastering
 Matt Vickerstaff - design, layout

External links
 Allmusic

Waylander (band) albums
2012 albums
Listenable Records albums